Jaume Bonet Serrano (born 24 May 1957) is a Spanish football coach, currently in charge of CE Vilassar de Dalt.

Playing career
Born in Valls, Tarragona, Catalonia, Bonet was a goalkeeper coach at Gimnàstic de Tarragona and in November 2001 he was appointed manager of the club, replacing fired Josep María Nogués. He was also in charge during the historical 1–0 win against Real Madrid for the Copa del Rey, but his team was eventually knocked out after a 2–4 loss at the Santiago Bernabéu Stadium.

On 20 January 2002, Bonet was relieved of his duties after the arrival of Carlos Diarte, and eventually returned to his previous role. On 2 January 2006 he was named CE Sabadell FC manager, with the side struggling in Segunda División B; on 21 March, after failing to achieve any win, he was sacked.

In the 2009 summer, after a spell at EF Valls, Bonet was appointed at the helm of CF Gavà. Despite the team's relegation from the third division, he was sacked in May 2010 due to 'economical reasons'.

On 8 April 2014, Bonet was named manager of FC Santboià until the end of the season. On 21 May he left the club, and moved to CE Vilassar de Dalt shortly after.

References

External links

1957 births
Living people
People from Valls
Sportspeople from the Province of Tarragona
Spanish football managers
Segunda División managers
Gimnàstic de Tarragona managers
CE Sabadell FC managers
FC Santboià managers